Epsilon is an Indomalayan and Australasian genus of potter wasps. It contains the following species:

 Epsilon achterbergi Giordani Soika, 1995
 Epsilon burmanicum (Bingham, 1897)
 Epsilon chartergiforme (Giordani Soika, 1962)
 Epsilon dyscherum (Saussure, 1853)
 Epsilon excavatus  (Borsato, 1994)
 Epsilon fujianensis Lee, 1981
 Epsilon grandipunctatum Gusenleitner, 1996
 Epsilon incola Giordani Soika, 1995
 Epsilon laboriosum (Smith, 1864)
 Epsilon manifestum (Smith, 1858)
 Epsilon subfistulosus (Wickwar, 1908)
 Epsilon tinctipenne (Walker, 1860)
 Epsilon vechti Giordani Soika, 1995

References

Biological pest control wasps
Potter wasps